Bareikiškės is a village in Vilnius district municipality, Lithuania. According to the 2011 census, it had population of 78. There is a library and cottage-like block of flats in Bareikiškės. A museum of Władysław Syrokomla in a manor, that belonged to him, is situated in Bareikiškės. Stanisław Moniuszko was a frequent visitor of Bareikiškės manor.

References

Villages in Vilnius County
Vilnius District Municipality